Juan Santiago Gordón (born 14 January 1943) is a Chilean hurdler. He competed in the men's 400 metres hurdles at the 1968 Summer Olympics.

References

1943 births
Living people
Athletes (track and field) at the 1967 Pan American Games
Athletes (track and field) at the 1968 Summer Olympics
Chilean male hurdlers
Olympic athletes of Chile
Place of birth missing (living people)
Pan American Games competitors for Chile